Alexandra Engelhardt ( Demmel, born 29 December 1982 in Munich) is a German freestyle wrestler. She competed in the freestyle 48 kg event at the 2012 Summer Olympics and was eliminated in the 1/8 finals by Mayelis Caripá.  At the 2008 Games she was knocked out in the second round.

References

External links
 
 
 

1982 births
Living people
German female sport wrestlers
Olympic wrestlers of Germany
Wrestlers at the 2008 Summer Olympics
Wrestlers at the 2012 Summer Olympics
Sportspeople from Munich
20th-century German women
21st-century German women